(released in the US as The Blind Swordsman: Zatoichi) is a 2003 Japanese Jidaigeki action film, directed, written, co-edited by and starring Takeshi Kitano ("Beat" Takeshi) in his 11th directorial venture. Kitano plays the role of the blind swordsman.

The film is a revival of the classic Zatoichi series of samurai film and television dramas. It premiered on 2 September 2003 at the Venice International Film Festival, where it won the prestigious Silver Lion for Best Director award, and went on to numerous other awards both at home and abroad. It also stars Tadanobu Asano, Michiyo Okusu, Yui Natsukawa, Guadalcanal Taka, Daigoro Tachibana, Yuko Daike, Ittoku Kishibe, Saburo Ishikura and Akira Emoto.

Plot
The film's plot follows a traditional theme, with Zatoichi (a blind swordsman) coming to the defense of townspeople caught up in a local yakuza gang war and being forced to pay excessive amounts of protection money. Meanwhile, Zatoichi befriends a local farmer and her gambler nephew and eventually offers his assistance to two geisha siblings (one of whom is actually a man) who are seeking revenge for the murder of their parents. The siblings are the only survivors of a robbery and massacre that was carried out on their family estate ten years ago. They soon discover the people responsible for the murders are the same yakuza wreaking havoc on the small town.

After slicing his way through an army of henchmen with his sword, Zatoichi defeats the yakuza's bodyguard, a powerful rōnin, in a duel. Zatoichi later wanders into town and confronts the yakuza bosses, killing the second-in-command and blinding the elderly yakuza boss (who had been masquerading as a bumbling old waiter up until this point) after surprising him by opening his eyes. The film ends with a dance number led by noted Japanese tap dance troupe The Stripes, and Zatoichi walking down a trail and tripping over a rock, saying "Even with my eyes wide open, I can't see anything."

Cast
 Takeshi Kitano as Zatoichi
 Tadanobu Asano as the rōnin Hattori Gennosuke
 Michiyo Okusu as Aunt O-ume, the farmer
 Yui Natsukawa as O-shino, Hattori's wife
 Daigoro Tachibana as O-sei
 Taichi Saotome as young O-sei
 Yūko Daike as O-kinu, sister of Osei.
 Guadalcanal Taka as Shinkichi, gambler nephew of Oume.
 Ittoku Kishibe as Ginzo, gang leader
 Saburo Ishikura as Ogiya, gang leader
 Akira Emoto as "Pops", tavern owner

Production
Kitano revealed that he was approached by others to create the film and therefore differed from his own techniques and followed the common filmmaking process in order to please them and make a pure-entertainment film.

This film marks Kitano's first collaboration with composer Keiichi Suzuki, ending an 11-year streak with Joe Hisaishi. The director said he made the decision feeling that the film needed percussion-based music and that Hisaishi is not a flexible composer, and also suggested that Hisaishi had become too expensive for him. Costumes were created by Kazuko Kurosawa.

Kitano used digital technology to increase the gore of the fights.

Reception
The film grossed  in Japan. Peter Bradshaw of The Guardian gave Zatoichi 4 out of 5 stars. Jasper Sharp of Midnight Eye praised the film as "pure cinematic magic". Allan Tong of Exclaim! said, "when Zatoichi is on screen, the film erupts with brilliant fury in unforgettable action sequences". The Washington Post praised the film while comparing it to Yojimbo, Sanjuro and Lone Wolf and Cub: Sword of Vengeance. On review aggregation website Rotten Tomatoes, the film had a approval rating of 86% based on 124 reviews.

Awards
 2003, September 6, Venice Film Festival, Silver Lion for Best Direction, Venice
 2003, Audience Award Leone Del Pubblico, Venice
 2003, September 14, 28th International Toronto International Film Festival, Audience Award AGF People's Choice Award, Toronto
 2003, London Film Festival
 2004, February 20, Japan Academy Prize, Outstanding Achievement in Film Editing, Outstanding Achievement in Music, Outstanding Achievement in Cinematography, Outstanding Achievement in Lighting Direction, Outstanding Achievement in Sound Recording, Tokyo

References

External links 
 
 
 
 
 

Zatoichi films
2003 films
2003 action films
Japanese action films
Samurai films
Yakuza films
Films about blind people
Films directed by Takeshi Kitano
2000s Japanese-language films
Shochiku films
Cross-dressing in film
Films about child prostitution
2000s Japanese films
Films about disability
Toronto International Film Festival People's Choice Award winners